Albert John Gourlay (31 July 1881 – 1 November 1918) was an Australian rules footballer who played with Melbourne and Carlton in the Victorian Football League (VFL). He died of wounds sustained in action during World War I.

Family
The son of John Ebenezer Gourlay (1853-), and Jessie Bruce Gourlay (1862-1889), née Bell, Albert John Gourlay was born at Emerald Hill on 31 July 1881.

He married Emma Randle Porteous (c.1871-1954), née Collie, in New Zealand, in 1909.

Football
Gourlay played his early football at West Melbourne before entering the VFL. He played just three games for Melbourne, in the 1903 VFL season and at the end of the year crossed to Carlton. Playing as a defender, Gourlay made three appearances with Carlton and experienced all possible results, a win, draw and a loss.

New Zealand
He later emigrated to New Zealand, where he got married and worked as a commercial traveller in Wellington.

Military service
In 1917 he signed up to serve his adopted country in the war and, in August 1917, travelled on the MMNZT 92 Ruahine, to the United Kingdom with the New Zealand Expeditionary Force.

Gourlay fought with the 29th Reinforcements of the Wellington Infantry Regiment, B Company, on the front and suffered serious wounds when fighting in some of the final offensives of the war.

Death
He died of the wounds he had sustained in action at a military hospital in England just ten days before the ceasefire. He is buried at Brookwood Military Cemetery, Woking, Surrey, England.

See also
 List of Victorian Football League players who died in active service

Footnotes

References
 
 World War One Nominal Roll: Private Albert John Gourlay (59358), collection of the Auckland War Memorial Museum.
 Fallen New Zealanders: Casualty and Hospital Lists, The New Zealand Times, (Wednesday, 6 November 1918), p.7.

External links
 
 
 Albert J. Gourlay, at The VFA Project.
 Photograph of Headstone, at Blueseum.
 Albert Gourlay, at Blueseum.
 Albert Gourlay, at Demonwiki.

1881 births
Melbourne Football Club players
Carlton Football Club players
West Melbourne Football Club players
New Zealand military personnel killed in World War I
1918 deaths
Australian rules footballers from Melbourne
People from South Melbourne
Australian emigrants to New Zealand
Military personnel from Melbourne